Michael Polowan is a bridge player.

Bridge accomplishments

Awards

 Mott-Smith Trophy (1) 1995

Wins

 North American Bridge Championships (4)
 Jacoby Open Swiss Teams (3) 1999, 2004, 2011 
 Vanderbilt (1) 1995

Runners-up

 North American Bridge Championships (9)
 Freeman Mixed Board-a-Match (1) 2014 
 Grand National Teams (2) 2012, 2013 
 Keohane North American Swiss Teams (1) 2013 
 Mitchell Board-a-Match Teams (2) 2009, 2011 
 Nail Life Master Open Pairs (2) 1990, 1994 
 Roth Open Swiss Teams (1) 2010

Notes

American contract bridge players
Living people
Year of birth missing (living people)